CCGS Martha L. Black is the lead ship of her class of light icebreakers of the Canadian Coast Guard. The ship was built in 1986 in Vancouver, British Columbia by Versatile Pacific Shipyards Limited as part of the CG Program Vessels. The vessel was mainly designed as a high-endurance, multi-tasked boat. Most of her duties are along the St. Lawrence River and St. Lawrence Seaway as she is able to handle the ice thickness there.

Design and description

The vessel is powered by two fixed-pitch propellers and bow thrusters powered by three Alco 251F diesel-electric engines creating , and three Canadian GE generators producing 6 megawatts of AC power driving two Canadian GE motors creating . The ship is also equipped with one Caterpillar C32 auxiliary generator and one Caterpillar 3306 emergency generator. The ship is certified as Arctic Class 2.

The icebreaker is equipped with one Racal Decca Bridgemaster navigational radar operating on the I band. Martha L. Black has a speedcrane capable of lifting . The ship carries two rigid-hulled inflatable boats and a self-propelled barge. 
Martha L. Black is equipped with a  flight deck and a  hangar which originally housed light helicopters of the MBB Bo 105 or Bell 206L types, but in the 2010s, the Bell 429 GlobalRanger and Bell 412EPI were acquired by the Canadian Coast Guard to replace the older helicopters. The ship can carry  of aviation fuel for the helicopters. The ship has a complement of 25, with 10 officers and 15 crew. Martha L. Black has 26 additional berths.

Service history
Constructed by Versatile Pacific Shipyards Limited at their yard in North Vancouver, British Columbia with the yard number 108, the vessel was launched on 6 September 1985. The ship entered service on 30 April 1986. The ship was named for Martha L. Black, a woman from Chicago, Illinois who immigrated to Canada and was a pioneering settler of Yukon. She became the second woman to be elected a Member of Parliament in Canada in 1935. The ship is registered in Ottawa, Ontario, and homeported at Quebec City. The vessel was initially assigned to the Western Region, but swapped places with sister ship .

The ship's primary duty is a buoy tender and navigational aids support in the Saint Lawrence River and Seaway and Saguenay River. Martha L. Black also provides icebreaking services to the same areas. In 2012, the ship transported scientists on a research mission to the Labrador Sea. In January 2014, Martha L. Black was one of two icebreakers called into the Saint Lawrence River to aid two passenger ferries which were prevented from crossing the river by ice. The ferries, which connect the Quebec communities of Sorel-Tracy and Saint-Ignace-de-Loyola, had been docked after ice conditions had become severe enough that the large icebreaker  needed reinforcement.

In 2016, Martha L. Black suffered damage to her three engines and remained out of service for three months, docked at Cacouna, Quebec.

References

Notes

Citations

Sources

External links

 CCGS Martha L Black

Martha L. Black-class icebreakers
Ships built in British Columbia
1986 ships